Erodium chium is a species of flowering plant in the family Geraniaceae.

Sources

References 

chium
Flora of Malta